Edinburgh Eastern is a constituency of the Scottish Parliament (Holyrood) covering part of the council area of Edinburgh. It elects one Member of the Scottish Parliament (MSP) by the plurality (first past the post) method of election. It is one of nine constituencies in the Lothian electoral region, which elects seven additional members, in addition to the nine constituency MSPs, to produce a form of proportional representation for the region as a whole.

The constituency was created for the 2011 Scottish Parliament election, and includes areas that were formerly part of the constituencies of Edinburgh East and Musselburgh and Midlothian North and Musselburgh, which were abolished. The seat has been held by Ash Denham of the Scottish National Party since the 2016 Scottish Parliament election.

Electoral region

The other eight constituencies of the Lothian region are Almond Valley, Edinburgh Central, Edinburgh Northern and Leith, Edinburgh Pentlands, Edinburgh Southern, Edinburgh Western, Linlithgow and Midlothian North and Musselburgh

The region includes all of the City of Edinburgh council area, parts of the East Lothian council area, parts of the Midlothian council area and all of the West Lothian council area.

Constituency boundaries and council area

Edinburgh is represented in the Scottish Parliament by six constituencies: Edinburgh Central, Edinburgh Eastern, Edinburgh Northern and Leith, Edinburgh Pentlands, Edinburgh Southern and Edinburgh Western.

Edinburgh Eastern uses the following electoral wards:

In full: Craigentinny/Duddingston
In part: City Centre, Leith, Liberton/Gilmerton, Portobello/Craigmillar

Member of the Scottish Parliament

Election results

2020s

2010s

Footnotes

External links

Constituencies in Edinburgh
Scottish Parliament constituencies and regions from 2011
Constituencies of the Scottish Parliament
2011 establishments in Scotland
Constituencies established in 2011
Portobello, Edinburgh